The following tables indicate the historic party affiliation of elected officials in the U.S. state of Wyoming including: 
Governor
Secretary of State
State Auditor
State Treasurer
Superintendent of Public Instruction
The tables also indicate the historical party composition in the:
State Senate
State House of Representatives
State delegation to the United States Senate
State delegation to the United States House of Representatives
For years in which a United States presidential election was held, the tables indicate which party's nominees received the State's electoral votes. Prior to statehood in 1889, there were fewer elected offices, as indicated.

Wyoming Territory

State of Wyoming

Notes

See also
Politics in Wyoming

Politics of Wyoming
Government of Wyoming
Wyoming